This article shows a list of cities and towns in Gabon:

List

Alphabetical list
Akanda
Akok
Bakoumba
Batouala
Belinga
Bifoun
Bitam
Bongoville
Booué
Cocobeach
Ekata
Étéké
Fougamou
Franceville
Gamba
Kango
Koulamoutou
Lalara
Lambaréné
Lastoursville
Leconi
Libreville (capital)
Makokou 
Mayumba
Mbigou
Médouneu
Mékambo
Mimongo
Minvoul
Mitzic
Moanda
Momo
Mouila
Mounana
Ndendé
Ndjolé
Nkan
Nkolabona
Ntoum
Okandja
Omboué (also known as Fernan Vaz)
Owendo
Oyem
Petit Loango
Point Denis
Port-Gentil
Santa Clara
Setté Cama
Ste. Marie
Souba-Haut-Ogooue, Gabon (Internationally known as event place of Summit of Africa United Organization in 1977)
Tchibanga
Tsogni
Zoula

See also

References

External links

 
Gabon, List of cities in
Gabon
Cities

it:Gabon#Città principali